Célia Surget is France's second female rabbi. She grew up in Geneva and was ordained at Leo Baeck College in 2007. She then joined Paris's Reform synagogue and the Mouvement Juif Liberal de France (Liberal Jewish Movement of France), and was a driving force in the creation and development of the Reform youth movement Netzer France.
She joined the Radlett and Bushey Reform Synagogue in the United Kingdom in 2012.

References

Living people
French Reform rabbis
Reform women rabbis
Year of birth missing (living people)
Clergy from Geneva
Place of birth missing (living people)
Alumni of Leo Baeck College
21st-century French rabbis